

Storms
Note:  indicates the name was retired after that usage in the respective basin

Earl
 1980 – drifted over the central Atlantic Ocean without affecting land.
 1986 – drifted over the central Atlantic Ocean without affecting land.
1992 – headed towards eastern Florida then veered away. No damage was reported.
1998 – struck the Florida Panhandle, causing approximately US$79 million in damage and 3 fatalities.
2004 – traveled across the Windward Islands, then dissipated. Its remnants became Hurricane Frank in the eastern Pacific Ocean.
 2010 – a strong, long-lived category 4 that affected most of the United States east coast and Canada.
 2016 – struck Belize as a minimal hurricane, then made a second landfall near Veracruz, Mexico as a tropical storm. The storm caused US$250 million in damage and 106 deaths.
 2022 – a Category 2 hurricane that drifted over the central Atlantic Ocean, caused 2 fatalities in Puerto Rico when it neared the island as a tropical storm.

Easy
 1950 – made landfall in Florida as a Category 3 hurricane; caused heavy damage in Cedar Key and produced heavy rainfall
 1951 – Category 4 hurricane that never threatened land.
 1952 – a minor storm.

Edith
1955 – a Category 2  hurricane which formed in the north-western Atlantic and slightly approached Bermuda as a Category 1.
1959 – a short-lived tropical storm that headed west-northwestward into the Antilles.
1963 – a Category 2 peaking at the Lesser Antilles and affecting the Greater Antilles as a tropical storm, causing ten deaths.
1967 (January) – a Category 3 severe tropical cyclone (Australian scale) south of East Java and west of northern-Western Australia.
1967 (September) – a mild tropical storm hitting the Lesser Antilles.
1971 (January) — a tropical storm-equivalent in the NHC/CPHC classification that formed off the Swahili coast and dissipated in Madagascar.
1971 (September) – the strongest hurricane in the 1971 Atlantic hurricane season.

Edna
 1945 – 
 1953 – 
 1954 – a deadly and destructive major hurricane that impacted the United States East Coast in September of the 1954 Atlantic hurricane season.
 1964 – 
 1968 – 
 1980 – 
 2014 – 

Edouard
1984 – a short-lived tropical storm in the Bay of Campeche and brushed Veracruz's port.
1990 – a tropical storm that affected the Azores in August.
1996 – the most powerful storm that formed during the 1996 Atlantic hurricane season.
2002 – a typical tropical storm that crossed Florida west.
2008 – a tropical storm that entered Texas.
2014 – Category 3 that strayed from land and whisked around in the North Atlantic Ocean.
2020 – a weak tropical storm that journeyed from the East Coast to Northern Europe while briefly affecting Bermuda and showering Europe.

Egay
 2003  – approached the Philippines, South Korea and Japan.
 2007 – struck Taiwan and China.
 2011 – approached the Philippines and Taiwan.
 2015 – affected south China.
 2019 – failed to become a tropical storm.

Eileen
 1947 – 
 1964 – 
 1966 – 
 1970 – 
 1974 – 

Ekeka (1992) – was the most intense off-season tropical cyclone on record in the northeastern Pacific basin.

Eketsang (2019) –

Eleanor
 1967 – 
 1971 – 
 1975 – 
 2018 – was an extratropical cyclone and European windstorm that affected Europe on the 2–3 January 2018. 

Elena
 1965 – never threatened land.
 1979 – made landfall in Texas as a weak tropical storm, causing $10 million in damage and two fatalities. 
 1985 – an unpredictable and damaging Category 3 hurricane which made landfall in Mississippi causing $1.3 billion (1985 USD) in damage.

Eli (1992) – struck the Philippines in July 1992, causing $273 million in damage (1992 USD) and four fatalities.

Eliakim (2018) – a tropical cyclone that affected Madagascar and killed 21 people in 2018.

Elida
 1984 – a Category 4 hurricane with no impacts on land.
 1990 – a Category 1 hurricane with no impacts on land.
 1996 – a moderate tropical storm with limited impacts, mainly rainfall, on the Baja California peninsula.
 2002 – a rare Category 5 hurricane that strengthened in record time for a Pacific hurricane; impacts on land were limited to large swells.
 2008 – a Category 2 hurricane with no impacts on land.
 2014 – a weak tropical storm with no impacts on land.
 2020 – a Category 2 hurricane with no impacts on land.

Elita (2004) – was an unusual tropical cyclone that made landfall on Madagascar three times.

Eline (2000) – was the second longest-lived Indian Ocean tropical cyclone on record (behind Cyclone Freddy), traveling over 11,000 km (6,800 mi) during its 29‑day duration throughout the entire month of February.
 
Eloise
1975  – the most destructive storm of the 1975 Atlantic hurricane season.
2021 – was the strongest tropical cyclone to impact the country of Mozambique since Cyclone Kenneth in 2019.

Ella
 1958 – deadly hurricane in Haiti and Cuba with over 35 deaths; tracked from the Lesser Antilles to southern Texas where it dissipated.
 1962 – strongest hurricane of the season; formed near Bahamas and tracked through the western Atlantic Ocean.
 1966 – tracked from tropical Atlantic before dissipating north of the Lesser Antilles
 1968 – Short-lived weak tropical storm.
 1970 – struck northeastern Mexico as a major hurricane.
 1976 – Short-lived storm that persisted to the northwest of Madagascar.
 1978 – strongest hurricane of the season; reached Category 4 status east of Maryland and south of Nova Scotia before brushing Newfoundland.
 1997 – short-lived tropical storm that dissipated near the Northern Marianas Islands
 1999 – tropical storm that passed through the Loyalty Islands, causing some damage on Lifou Island but no reported casualties.

Ellie
 1991 – an unusually small typhoon which hit Taiwan as a tropical storm.
 1994 – a powerful category 1 typhoon impact Japan, Northeast China and Korean Peninsula
 2009 – Category 1 tropical cyclone (Australian scale) made landfall Queensland.
 2022 – Category 1 tropical cyclone (Australian scale), made landfall 22 December 2022 Western Australia and Northern Territory.

Ellen
 1950 – 
 1955 – 
 1959 – struck Japan.
 1961 – 
 1964 – 
 1967 – 
 1970 – 
 1973 (July) – struck Japan. 
 1973 (September)
 1976 – struck Hong Kong.
 1980 – 
 1983 – struck the Philippines.
 1986 –

Elsa
 1975 –  affected Madagascar and Mozambique but no damage was reported.
 1976 – 
 2019 – caused substantial damage in southern Europe and at least eight fatalities were reported.
 2021 – formed in the eastern Caribbean Sea, the earliest fifth named storm in the Atlantic; twice became a minimal hurricane, though made landfall in Cuba and later in Florida and then in Rhode Island, each while at tropical storm intensity.

Elsie
 1950 – 
 1954 – major typhoon that moved up the coast of Vietnam, which then rapidly strengthened, before rapidly weakening before hitting China.
 1958 – typhoon that moved to the north of Japan, before transitioning into an extratropical cyclone.
 1961 – slow moving typhoon that neared the coast of Taiwan before speeding up. It then hit China as a moderate storm.
 1964 – category 3-equivalent typhoon that rapidly strengthened as it neared the coast of Luzon, before rapidly weakening right before landfall.
 1966 – category 4-equivalent typhoon that brought record-breaking rainfall to parts of Taiwan.
 1969 – super typhoon that made landfall on Taiwan as a moderate typhoon, and then went on to hit China as a category 1.
 1972 – moderate typhoon that slowed down before hitting Vietnam as a typhoon.
 1975 – super typhoon that passed to the south of Taiwan at peak intensity, before going on to hit Hong Kong as a moderate typhoon.
 1981 – super typhoon that stayed out to sea.
 1985 – second of two systems to form in January. Both of these systems co-existed together for about 4 days.
 1987 – 
 1988 – short-lived system that never posed a threat to land.
 1989 –  intense super typhoon that made a catastrophic landfall on Luzon as a category 5-equivalent typhoon.
 1992 – super typhoon that maintained category 5 status for a day, and stayed out to sea.
 1998 – 

Ema
 1982 – never threatened land. 
 2019 – did not affect land.

Emilia
 1978 – never affected land.
 1982 – never affected land.
 1988 – never affected land.
 1994 – Category 5 hurricane, threatened Hawaii but turned away without affecting land.
 2000 – never affected land.
 2006 – came near Baja California but turned away.
 2012 – strong Category 4 hurricane, churned in the open ocean.
 2018 – never affected land.

Emily
 1962 – short-lived storm, no threat to land.
1963 – 
1965 – 
1969 – 
 1972 – off Queensland, eight lives lost at sea.
1973 – 
1977 – 
1981 – crossed Bermuda.
1987 – caused considerable damage to Saint Vincent, Dominican Republic, and Bermuda.
1993 – came near Hatteras Island, North Carolina.
1999 – no threat to land, absorbed by Hurricane Cindy.
2005 – Category 5 hurricane, caused damage in Grenada, Quintana Roo, and Tamaulipas.
2011 – caused minor damage throughout the Caribbean.
2017 – made landfall in Tampa, Florida.

Emma
1952 – 
1956 – Category 4 typhoon that affected Okinawa and South Korea, killing 77.
1959 – 
1962 – damage in Guam and Saipan totaled out to $250,000.
 1963 – 
1965 – 
1967 – 
1971 – 
1974 – 
1977 – 
 1984 –
 1995 – 
 2006 – 
 2008 – passed through Central Europe.
 2018 – brought heavy snow falls

Emong
 2001 – approached Taiwan and struck China.
 2005 – a tropical depression that was only recognized by PAGASA.
 2009 – 
 2013 – approached Japan.
 2017
 2021 – 

Emnati (2022) –  a tropical cyclone that affected Madagascar, only two weeks after Cyclone Batsirai.

Enala (2023) – remained at sea and never threatened land.

Enawo (2017) – a strongest tropical cyclone to strike Madagascar since Gafilo in 2004, killing 78 people and causing $400 million in damages.

Enrique
 1979 – strong Category 4 hurricane that remained at sea.
 1985 – weak tropical storm that brought showers to Hawaii.
 1991 – long-lived hurricane that was one of seven tropical cyclones to exist in all three tropical cyclone basins in the Pacific Ocean.
 1997 – remained at sea and never threatened land.
 2003 – strong tropical storm that had no effects on land.
 2009 – another strong tropical storm that did not affect land.
 2015 – lasted for a week without affecting land.
 2021 – strong Category 1 hurricane that paralleled the coast of Mexico.

Enteng
 2004 – 
 2008 – 
 2012 –
 2016 – 
 2020 – 

Epsilon
 2005 – category 1 hurricane that persisted beyond the official November 30 end date of the hurricane season.
 2020 – late-season Category 3 hurricane that tracked east of Bermuda.

 Erica (2003) – a powerful cyclone that severely affected New Caledonia and was considered the worst to affect the country since Cyclone Beti. 

Erick
 1983 – did not make landfall.
 1985 – one of two tropical cyclones to affect the island nations of Vanuatu and Fiji within a week during January 1985. 
 1989 – did not make landfall.
 1996 – did not make landfall.
 2001 – did not make landfall.
 2007 – did not make landfall.
 2009 – a weak tropical cyclone affected eastern Madagascar.
 2013 – brought minor impacts to the western coastline of Mexico in July 2013, and was the last of a succession of four Category 1 hurricanes to affect the Pacific coast of Mexico early in the 2013 Pacific hurricane season.
 2019 – a powerful category 4 hurricane not make landfall.

Erika
 1991 – struck São Miguel and Santa Maria islands in the Azores as an extratropical storm.
 1997 – long-lived Category 3 hurricane that approached the Lesser Antilles before curving northward and moving into the open ocean.
 2003 – weak Category 1 hurricane that made landfall in northeastern Mexico, near the Texas-Tamaulipas border.
 2009 – made landfall on Guadeloupe, and dissipated southeast of Puerto Rico the following day.
 2015 – made landfall on Dominica; caused US$500 million in damage and 31 fatalities. 

Erin
1989 – Category 2 hurricane that circled in the North Atlantic Ocean.
1995 – a moderate hurricane that was the first hurricane to strike the United States since Hurricane Andrew in 1992, traversing over Cuba and The Bahamas, central Florida, and Alabama, Louisiana, and Mississippi.
2001 – Category 3 that became the longest-lived hurricane of the 2001 Atlantic hurricane season which touched Bermuda, produced waves on the North Carolina coastline, became extratropical after passing Cape Race, Newfoundland and was absorbed by another storm in Greenland.
2007 – a tropical storm that slightly affected Texas and Oklahoma with abnormal strength.
2013 – a short-pathed Cape Verde tropical storm.
2019 – formed off the coast of North Carolina and then moved out to sea; later, after becoming extratropical, produced heavy rain over the Canadian Maritime provinces.

 Ernest (2005) – was one of two intense tropical cyclones in the 2004–05 South-West Indian Ocean cyclone season. 

Ernesto
 1982 – formed southwest of Bermuda and dissipated without threatening land.
 1988 – formed east of Bermuda and did not cause any damage or casualties.
 1994 – formed southwest of Cape Verde and dissipated without affecting land.
 2000 – lasted for two days and did not threaten land.
 2006 – a Category 1 hurricane which formed near the Windward Islands, made landfall in Haiti and Cuba, struck Florida and the Carolinas, and killed at least 11 people.
 2012 – a Category 2 hurricane which made landfall in Mexico.
 2018 – formed in the North Atlantic and dissipated without affecting land.

Esami (2020) – a moderate tropical storm without affecting any landmass.

Estelle
 1960 – a Category 1 hurricane, that affected the coast of Central America and Mexico.
 1968 – a long-lived tropical storm.
 1972 – category 1 hurricane.
 1976 – a weak and short-lived tropical storm.
 1980 – a weak tropical storm.
 1986 – a strong hurricane, that moved south of Hawaii.
 1992 – a category 4 hurricane, that formed far away from the coast.
 1998 – a category 4 hurricane, that did not affect land.
 2004 – moved into the Central Pacific.
 2010 – a strong tropical storm in August.
 2016 – strong tropical storm, that churned in the open ocean.
 2022 – a Category 1 hurricane that formed near Mexico but moved out to sea.

Ester
 2006 – 
 2010 – 
 2014 – that was only recognized by PAGASA and JMA as a tropical storm, and by JTWC as a subtropical storm.
 2018 –
 2022 – struck the mainland of South Korea.

Eta (2020) – was a deadly and erratic Category 4 hurricane that devastated parts of Central America in early November 2020.

Etau
 2003 – struck Japan.
 2009 – approached Japan and brought heavy rain.
 2015 - struck Japan and brought heavy rain.
 2020 - a weak tropical storm that made landfall in Vietnam as a tropical depression.

Ethel
 1956 –  formed near the Bahamas and moved out to sea.
 1960 – a Category 3 hurricane that weakened to a tropical storm prior to making landfall in Pascagoula, Mississippi.
 1964 – a Category 2 hurricane that passed to the northeast of Bermuda.
 1996 – twice transited Cape York Peninsula before making a final landfall along the southern coast of the Gulf of Carpentaria, in the Northern Territory.
 2012 – a Category 1 equivalent cyclone that passed near Rodrigues.

Eugene
 1981 – a weak storm that did not affect land.
 1987 – a category 2 storm that made landfall south of Manzanillo, Mexico; caused heavy flooding and loss of power for Mexican coastal region.
 1993 – a category 3 storm that made landfall on the Big Island of Hawaii as a tropical depression.
 1999 – a category 2 storm that remained at sea, passing well south of Hawaii.
 2005 – briefly threatened Baja California Sur, but remained at sea.
 2011 – reached Category 4 intensity, but was no threat to land.
 2017 – a category 3 storm that remained at sea.

Eva
 1961 – remained at sea.
 1970 –  a tropical cyclone that struck northern Australia.
 2022 – remnants of the cyclone intensified the rainfall during the 2022 eastern Australia floods in late February and early March.

Evan
1997 – which impacted waters northeast of New Zealand.
2004 – which brought flooding to Groote Eylandt and the Northern Territory.
2012 – which impacted Fiji, Western Samoa, American Samoa, Tonga.

Evelyn (1977) – Category 1 that mainly impacted Atlantic Canada and hit Bermuda as a tropical storm.

Ewiniar
 2000 – 
 2006 - system that made landfall in South Korea as a tropical storm while also affecting Palau, Yap, China, and the Ryūkyū Islands in Japan, causing $1.4 billion in damages and 203 deaths. 
 2012 – 
 2018 – caused damaging floods to Vietnam and South China, causing 14 deaths and $784 million in damages.

See also

Tropical cyclone
Tropical cyclone naming
European windstorm names
Atlantic hurricane season
List of Pacific hurricane seasons
South Atlantic tropical cyclone

References
General

 
 
 
 
 
 
 
 
 
 
 
 
 
 
 
 
 

 
 
 
 
 

E